Catocala lesbia is a moth of the family Erebidae first described by Hugo Theodor Christoph in 1887. It is found in the Middle East, in regions without severe winters. In Turkey, south-east of the Anatolian Plateau, in oases and desert foothills in Iraq, south as far as the Sinai and Egypt. In Israel it is found in the Jordan Rift Valley and Negev.

Adults are on wing from June to September depending on the location. There is one generation per year in most of its range. There are two generations in Iraq.

The larvae feed on Populus euphratica.

Subspecies
Catocala lesbia lesbia
Catocala lesbia fittkaui Kravchenko, et al., 2008 (Waziristan, Pakistan)

References

External links

Image

lesbia
Moths described in 1887
Moths of Asia
Moths of the Middle East